Nemo is a 1984 Fantasy film directed by Arnaud Sélignac. It is also known as Dream One.

Plot
A young boy imagines being in a tale he's about to hear. In this magical world he encounters many famous characters from other tales, aliens, and other beings, and of course, a beautiful princess.

Cast
 Seth Kibel as Child Nemo
 Jason Connery as Teen Nemo
 Mathilda May as Alice
 Harvey Keitel as Mr. Legend
 Nipsey Russell as Mr. Rip / Benjamin
 Carole Bouquet as Rals-Akrai
 Michel Blanc as Boris / Nemo's Father
 Katrine Boorman as Duchka / Nemo's Mother
 Dominique Pinon as Monkey
 Charley Boorman as Cunegond / Elevator Operator
 Gaetan Bloom as Puchkine
 Pierre Forget as Wagner
 Marcus Powell as Grunwald
 Carla D. Clark as Young Bess

Production
Goldcrest Films invested £2,099,000 in the film and received £1,482,000, making a loss of £617,000.

References

External links
Nemo at Letterbox DVD

1984 films
1984 fantasy films
British fantasy films
French fantasy films
English-language French films
1980s British films
1980s American films
1980s French films